Kyuptsy is a rural locality (a selo) and the administrative center, and one of two inhabited localities including Tumul of Kyupsky National Rural Okrug in Ust-Maysky District of the Sakha Republic, Russia, located  from Ust-Maya, the administrative center of the district. Its population at the 2002 census was 294.

References

Notes

Sources
Official website of the Sakha Republic. Ust-Maysky District: Registry of the Administrative-Territorial Divisions of the Sakha Republic]. 

Rural localities in Ust-Maysky District